Anthony John Onwuegbuzie is a British-American educational psychologist who is a senior research associate at the University of Cambridge's Research for Equitable Access and Learning (REAL) Centre. He was formerly professor in the Department of Educational Leadership and Counseling at Sam Houston State University. As of 2016, he was the president of the Mixed Methods International Research Association.

Previous positions
In 2003, he was appointed an associate professor in the Department of Educational Measurement and Research at the University of South Florida. He later became a full professor there. From 2007 to 2009, he was the editor of the Research & News section of the academic journal Educational Researcher.

References

External links
Archived Biography at University of South Florida website

Prof. Dr. Anthony J. Onwuegbuzie felicitated by KU

Living people
21st-century American psychologists
Educational psychologists
Sam Houston State University faculty
University of South Carolina alumni
University of South Florida faculty
British emigrants to the United States
Educational researchers
1962 births
20th-century American psychologists